Georges is a French name with the same origin as the English name George. It may refer to:

People with the given name "Georges" include

A 
Georges Abi-Saab
Georges Abrial
Georges Adéagbo
Georges Adwan
Georges Agabekov
Georges Akieremy
Georges Altman
Georges Anderla
Georges André
Georges Andrique
Georges Anglade
Georges Annenkov
Georges Aperghis
Georges-Jean Arnaud
Georges Arvanitas
Georges Auguste
Georges Auric
Georges Azenstarck

B 
Georges Ba
Georges Badin
Georges Balandier
Georges Ball
Georges Bank
Georges Bardet
Georges-Isidore Barthe
Georges Bataille
Georges Beauchemin
Georges Beaucourt
Georges Bédard
Georges Bégué
Georges Bénédite
Georges Bénézé
Georges Bereta
Georges Berger
Georges Bernanos
Georges Bernier
Georges Bess
Georges Besse
Georges Biassou
Georges Bidault
Georges Biscot
Georges Bizet
Georges-Henri Blouin
Georges Boillot
Georges Bonnet
Georges Boucher
Georges Boudarel
Georges Boulanger (violinist)
Georges Bouriano
Georges Braque
Georges Brassens
Georges Bregy
Georges Briard
Georges Brossard
Georges Brunschvig
Georges Burou

C 
Georges Cadoudal
Georges Canguilhem
Georges Capdeville
Georges Carnus
Georges Carpentier
Georges Casolari
Georges Catroux
Georges Antoine Chabot
Georges Chaperot
Georges Chappe
Georges Charpak
Georges Charpy
Georges Chastellain
Georges Chatelain
Georges-André Chevallaz
Georges Chometon
Georges Christen
Georges Claude
Georges Clemenceau
Georges Clément
Georges Cochery
Georges Condominas
Georges Corm
Georges Corraface
Georges Corvington
Georges Coste
Georges Cottier
Georges Coudray
Georges Courteline
Georges Couthon
Georges Croegaert
Georges Crozier
Georges Cziffra

D 
Georges d'Amboise
Georges Dandelot
Georges Danton
Georges Darboy
Georges Dard
Georges Darien
Georges d'Armagnac
Georges de Beauregard
Georges de Brébeuf
Georges de Feure
Georges-Charles de Heeckeren d'Anthès
Georges de la Falaise
Georges de la Nézière
Georges de La Tour
Georges de la Trémoille
Georges de Layens
Georges-Daniel de Monfreid
Georges De Moor
Georges de Paris
Georges de Porto-Riche
Georges de Rham
Georges de Scudéry
Georges de Selve
Georges Decaux
Georges Delahaie
Georges Delerue
Georges Delfanne
Georges-Isidore Delisle
Georges Demenÿ
Georges Depping
Georges A. Deschamps
Georges-Casimir Dessaulles
Georges Detreille
Georges Diebolt
Georges Dimou
Georges Dionne
Georges Dor
Georges Doriot
Georges Doussot
Georges Dransart
Georges Dreyer
Georges Duboeuf
Georges Duby
Georges Dufrénoy
Georges Duhamel
Georges Dumas
Georges Dumézil
Georges Dumont
Georges-Hilaire Dupont
Georges-Hippolyte le Comte Dupré
Georges-Mathieu de Durand
Georges Duval de Leyrit

E 
Georges Eekhoud
Georges El Ghorayeb
Georges Eo
Georges Erasmus

F 
Georges Farrah
Georges Fenech
Georges Feydeau
Georges Figon
Georges Fleurix
Georges Florovsky
Georges Fouré
Georges Fournier
Georges Franju
Georges Frêche
Georges Friedel
Georges Friedmann

G 
Georges Galinat
Georges Gandil
Georges Garnier
Georges Garvarentz
Georges Gauthier
Georges Gautschi
Georges Géret
Georges Gilles de la Tourette
Georges Gilson
Georges Gimel
Georges Girard
Georges Gorse
Georges Gourdy
Georges Goven
Georges Goyau
Georges-François-Xavier-Marie Grente
Georges Grignard
Georges Groussard
Georges Grün
Georges Guenette
Georges Guibourg
Georges Guillain
Georges Gurvitch
Georges Guynemer

H 
Georges Hamacek
Georges Hartmann
Georges Haupt
Georges-Eugène Haussmann
Georges Hayem
Georges Hebbelinck
Georges Hebdin
Georges Hébert
Georges Hector
Georges Hellebuyck
Georges Heylens
Georges Hilbert
Georges Gamal
Georges Holvoet
Georges Hüe

I 
Georges Ifrah
Georges Imbert
Georges Irat
Georges Izambard

J 
Georges Jacob
Georges Jacobs
Georges Janssen
Georges Jean
Georges Jobé
Georges Jules Piquet

K 
Georges J. F. Köhler
Georges Kopp

L 
Georges-C. Lachance
Georges Lacombe (film director)
Georges Lacombe (painter)
Georges Ladoux
Georges Washington de La Fayette
Georges Lafontaine
Georges Lagouge
Georges Lagrange
Georges Lakhovsky
Georges Lamia
Georges-Émile Lapalme
Georges Laraque
Georges Lautner
Georges Lech
Georges Leclanché
Georges-Louis Leclerc, Comte de Buffon
Georges Lecointe (disambiguation)
Georges Leekens
Georges Lefebvre
Georges Legrain
Georges Lemaire
Georges Lemaître
Georges Lentz
Georges Léonnec
Georges Leredu
Georges-Henri Lévesque
Georges Lévis
Georges Leygues
Georges Limbour
Georges Loustaunau-Lacau

M 
Georges Madon
Georges Mager
Georges Malfait
Georges Malkine
Georges Mandel
Georges Mandjeck
Georges Mantha
Georges Marchais
Georges Marchal
Georges Mareschal
Georges Marrane
Georges Martin (freemason)
Georges Matheron
Georges Mathieu
Georges Meekers
Georges Melchior
Georges Méliès
Georges Menahem
Georges Meunier
Georges Miez
Georges Migot
Georges Miquelle
Georges Montefiore-Levi
Georges Mora
Georges Moustaki
Georges Mouton
Georges Mouyémé

N 
Georges Nagelmackers
Georges Neveux
Georges Nomarski
Georges Niang

O 
Georges Ohnet
Georges Oltramare

P 
Georges Painvin
Georges Palante
Georges Panayotis
Georges Parent
Georges Pasquier
Georges Passerieu
Georges Patient
Georges Paulais
Georges Paulin
Georges Paulmier
Georges Péclet
Georges Perec
Georges Périnal
Georges Perros
Georges Petit
Georges Peyroche
Georges Pharand
Georges Philippe (disambiguation)
Georges Pichard
Georges Picot
Georges Picquart
Georges Pintens
Georges Piot
Georges-René Pléville Le Pelley
Georges Politzer
Georges Polti
Georges Pompidou
Georges Pouchet
Georges Poulet
Georges Poulin
Georges Prêtre
Georges Prud'Homme

Q 
Georges Querelle

R 
Georges Raeders
Georges Rawiri
Georges Rayet
Georges Reeb
Georges Remi
Georges Renaud
Georges Renavent
Georges Rey
Georges Ribemont-Dessaignes
Georges Ricard-Cordingley
Georges Richard
Georges Rigal
Georges Robin
Georges Rochegrosse
Georges Rodenbach
Georges Roesch
Georges Ronsse
Georges Rossignon
Georges Rouault
Georges Rousse
Georges Roux (illustrator)
Georges Ruggiu

S 
Georges Saadeh
Georges Sadoul
Georges Sagnac
Georges Saillard
Georges Sainte-Rose
Georges Santos
Georges Scelle
Georges Schneider
Georges Schoeters
Georges Schwizgebel
Georges Scott
Georges Sébastian
Georges-Pierre Seurat
Georges Simenon
Georges Sorel
Georges Speicher
Georges Spénale
Georges St-Pierre
Georges Stein
 Georges Stern
Georges Suarez
Georges Sylvain

T 
Georges Taillandier
Georges Tanguay
Georges Tate
Georges Thenault
Georges Theunis
Georges Thiébaud
Georges Thierry d'Argenlieu
Georges Thill
Georges Thines
Georges William Thornley
Georges Thurnherr
Georges Thurston
Georges Touquet-Daunis
Georges Troisfontaines
Georges Turcot

U 
Georges Urbain

V 
Georges Vacher de Lapouge
Georges Valade
Georges Valensi
Georges Valois
Georges Van Haelen
Georges van Vrekhem
Georges Vandenberghe
Georges Vanier (disambiguation)
Georges Vanier
Georges Vantongerloo
Georges Vedel
Georges Vereeken
Georges Verriest
Georges Vézina
Georges Vianès
Georges Vuilleumier

W 
Georges Wakhévitch
Georges Wilson
Georges Wohlfart
Georges Wolinski

Z 
Georges Zvunka

People with the surname "Georges" include 
Annette Solange Georges (born 1957), lawyer, Seychellois politician and leader of the Seychelles United Opposition Party
Carla Georges, better known as simply Carla (born 2003), French singer
Julia Goerges (born 1988), German tennis player
Myrtille Georges (born 1990), French tennis player
Paul Georges (1923–2002), American painter
Olga Georges-Picot (1940–1997), French actress

Other names
Paul Georges Dieulafoy (1839–1911), French physician and surgeon
Marie-Georges Pascal (1946–1985), French actress
Marie-George Buffet (born 1949), French politician

French masculine given names